The Pepsi Globe is the logo for Pepsi, named for the red, white, and blue design in a sphere-like shape. It is one of the most recognizable logos in the world.

History
The modern Pepsi logo has its origins in the 1940s, during World War II. Pepsi unveiled a new bottle cap that featured the Pepsi script surrounded by red and blue colors on a white background. Since Pepsi was recognizable with its script logo in the same manner as its main rival, Coca-Cola, the cap logo was meant as a show of U.S. patriotism.

The cap logo became Pepsi's primary logo around 1945. The logo was redesigned in 1962 as a bottle cap, replacing the script in favor of a modern "Pepsi" type treatment

The logo was updated again in 1973, when the wordmark was made smaller to fit in the white section of the logo. The bottle cap motif was dropped and the logo was flanked with a red bar on the left and a light-blue bar on the right. A vertical variation of this would also have the red bar on the bottom and the light-blue bar on the top or omitted. The logo was modified in a new font in 1987.

In 1991, no typeface of any kind would be in the white section of the logo on a regular Pepsi product. Instead, the red bar would be lengthened slightly, the light-blue bar removed, and the Pepsi wordmark was moved to the top.

In 1997, the red bar was removed as Pepsi adopted all-blue packaging, and visually detailed the Pepsi Globe to appear three-dimensional. This was the first official use of the logo as the “Pepsi Globe.” The design was refined in early 2003 when the typeface was updated and the Pepsi Globe became more detailed. This version remained mostly the same in 2006 when Pepsi redesigned the packaging once more to show different backgrounds on each can, though the color remained blue.

"New" Pepsi Globe

In October 2008, Pepsi announced it would be redesigning its logo and re-branding many of its products by mid-2009. The New York-based brand consultancy agency Arnell Group was hired on a $1 million contract to perform the brand update, leading to a 27-page design proposal titled BREATHTAKING Design Strategy.  The document was subsequently leaked on Reddit by a user claiming to be an industry freelancer and garnered mixed reception, being described in some press reports as "bizarre", "nonsensical", and "brand-equity pop-psychobabble". Rumors were reported that the document was a hoax perpetrated by the Arnell Group itself as a component of a viral marketing campaign. In an interview with AdAge, agency namesake Peter Arnell commented on the project:

"When I did the Pepsi logo, I told Pepsi that I wanted to go to Asia, to China and Japan, for a month and tuck myself away and just design it and study it and create it … There was a lot of research, a lot of consumer data points … and dialogue that I had with the folks at Pepsi, consumers and retailers. We knew what we were doing."

Pepsi, Diet Pepsi, and Pepsi Max now use all lower-case fonts for name brands, Mountain Dew has been renamed "Mtn Dew," and Diet Pepsi Max has been re-branded as Pepsi Max, because the original 1993 version is no longer available in the United States. The new imagery has started to be used. The new lower-case font used on Pepsi's products are reminiscent of the font used in Diet Pepsi's logo from the 1970s to the mid-1980s.

The white area of the logo became a series of "smiles," with the central white band arcing at different angles depending on the product until mid 2010. Regular Pepsi had a medium-sized "smile", while Diet Pepsi had a small "grin". Pepsi Max's variant was the most different, using a large "laugh" and also used black in the bottom third of the globe as opposed to the more standard royal blue. In July 2010, Diet Pepsi, Pepsi Max, and all other Pepsi variants (except Pepsi ONE) began using the regular "smile" logo as it was redesigned to match the global branding.

The new Pepsi design was unveiled in Canada in 2009. It was then released in other countries outside the US in 2010 such as France and the UK, meaning the 2003 design was phased out completely. In the UK, the current "smile" logo features the globe in the center, and the "Pepsi" text below it, as opposed to the tilted text in the US.

As of 2014, the only Pepsi product not using the redesigned Pepsi Globe is Pepsi Throwback. Throwback deliberately uses retro 1973 logo on the packaging due to the drink using an older formula of Pepsi containing sugarcane instead of high-fructose corn syrup that is more commonly found in soft drinks today in the US. The product was renamed Pepsi-Cola Made With Real Sugar in 2014, and uses the 1950s-era script logo in addition to the modern globe logo. Pepsi ONE previously used the 2005 logo until late 2012, when it adopted the current smile logo to keep in line with Pepsi's current branding; Pepsi ONE would be discontinued in 2015.

Cost
The true cost of the new logo is difficult to quantify including the costs of replacing the old logo on trucks, vending machines, stadium signs, billboards, point-of-sale materials and other places that displayed the old Pepsi logo. One expert estimated that this cost could easily reach several hundred million dollars. The estimated time to remake this icon was about 5 months. The CEO of Pepsi, Indra Nooyi, called for a "quantum leap" forward in reconstructing the soft drink business and for Pepsi to be recognized as a cultural leader. Pepsi needed to find ways to cut costs in the next few years. It laid off many workers, primarily in the Frito-Lay division, and spent significantly less on television advertising in 2010 and 2011. In those years Coca-Cola spent roughly 8% of sales on television advertising while Pepsi spent 3%. In 2012 Pepsi spent an estimated $400 million to $500 million on advertising spending.

Diet Pepsi
Diet Pepsi was using 1960s-style script with light-blue waves below the script on a white background from the 1970s to 1980s.

When the product was reformulated with NutraSweet in 1984, Diet Pepsi received a jagged, multi-layered version of the Pepsi Globe. With the "Diet Pepsi" typeface positioned above the globe, it marked the first time no text was in the white section of the Pepsi Globe on any Pepsi product. The text being absent from the Pepsi Globe would carry over with regular Pepsi in 1991.

Diet Pepsi has used the Pepsi Globe since, as it became more standardized in 1991, along with Pepsi's other products.

Notes

References

External links

PepsiCo
Trademarks
Drink company logos
Symbols introduced in the 1940s
Soft drink logos
Commercial logos